Jeffrey William Seeney (born 2 February 1957) is a former Australian politician and the former Deputy Premier, Minister for State Development and Minister for Infrastructure and Planning of Queensland. He was a member of the Legislative Assembly of Queensland from 1998 to 2017, representing Callide for the Nationals (1998–2008) and merged Liberal National Party (2008–2017).

Seeney was Leader of the Opposition from September 2006 until January 2008 when he was ousted in favour of his predecessor, Lawrence Springborg. In March 2011, successive leader John-Paul Langbroek stood down in favour of Brisbane Lord Mayor Campbell Newman. Seeney was elected as deputy leader of the LNP, and became interim opposition leader while Newman led the LNP into the 2012 Queensland state election.  The LNP won a landslide victory at that election, and per a previous agreement Seeney ceded his post as LNP parliamentary leader to Newman, clearing the way for Newman to become Premier of Queensland.

After the LNP lost power in the 2015 state election, Seeney moved to the backbench. He retired at the 2017 state election.

Political career
Jeff Seeney served on the Monto shire council from 1992 to 1998, serving as the deputy mayor for the last four years. During this time, he worked on the National Party's State Central Council from 1991 to 1998. He was elected to parliament in the 1998 Queensland election.  Seeney was elected deputy leader of the National Party alongside leader Lawrence Springborg in February 2003.

Widely thought by parliament as an aggressive tactician he was given the role of the Leader of Opposition Business which often requires a tactical and aggressive approach. He was also Shadow Minister for Mines and Energy.

In November 2014, questions were raised after Seeney used his ministerial powers to rezone a privately owned caravan park on the Sunshine Coast. This rezoning was against the wishes of the local council and against the advice of his own department. The owner of the park benefited from the rezoning and had links with LNP.

On 28 November he wrote to Redlands council dated 28 November, requiring that they remove "any assumption about a theoretical projected sea level rise" from the plans. This decision was widely criticised by engineers and planners. Australia's National Committee on Coastal and Ocean Engineering described it as "at odds with decades of scientific research, professional engineering practice and rationality."

On 2 March 2017 Seeney announced he would retire at the next state election.

Leadership

Following the Coalition's loss at the 2006 state election, standing leader Lawrence Springborg relinquished leadership of the opposition and the Queensland National Party. 

On 18 September 2006, Seeney was endorsed as the new state National Party leader, with Maroochydore representative Fiona Simpson as his deputy.

Seeney and Simpson are reported to have never got along well. This conflict, combined with the leadership instability and performance of the Liberal Party, combined to keep the opposition on the back foot.

On 21 January 2008, after opinion polls showed Seeney well behind newly installed premier Anna Bligh, Springborg launched a party-room coup and ousted Seeney as leader. After the merging of the National and Liberal parties, Seeney became a member of the Liberal National Party. Springborg kept him in the shadow ministry as Shadow Minister for Mines and Energy  which he retained under Springborg's successor, John-Paul Langbroek.

On 22 March 2011, Seeney once again became opposition leader, following Langbroek's resignation from that position. Campbell Newman, the Lord Mayor of Brisbane, was elected his successor a few days later. Seeney was named deputy leader, replacing Springborg after Seeney was elected the new interim parliamentary leader. After it became apparent that a by-election could not be arranged to get Newman into the legislature, it was announced that Seeney would act as interim parliamentary leader of the LNP—and hence Leader of the Opposition.  Tim Nicholls served as his deputy. Newman, who had won preselection for Ashgrove, would lead the LNP election team from outside parliament. It was understood that if Newman was elected to the legislature, Seeney would cede his post as parliamentary leader to Newman.

The LNP won the largest majority government in Queensland history at the 2012 election.  The next day, with counting still underway even though the LNP's victory was beyond doubt, Bligh resigned as premier and state Labor leader and announced her retirement from politics.  Newman announced that he would name Seeney as Deputy Premier and Minister for State Development, with additional responsibility for the Coordinator General. He served in an interim three-man cabinet with Newman and Nicholls until the full ministry was sworn in on 3 April. He was the highest-ranking minister from the Nationals side of the merger.

Seeney was Deputy Premier for the entirety of the Newman Government's tenure which came to an end with its defeat at the 2015 election with Newman himself losing his seat. After the election defeat Springborg made his comeback as LNP leader.

The following year in 2016, Seeney's past leadership feud with Springborg resurfaced when Seeney was the key architect in displacing Springborg as leader by Seeney's former deputy Tim Nicholls.

Personal life
Seeney received a certificate in rural business management from QUT and was the former chairman of the Burnett Inland Economic Development Organisation (BIEDO).

References

External links
 Official Biography

1957 births
Living people
Deputy Premiers of Queensland
Members of the Queensland Legislative Assembly
Liberal National Party of Queensland politicians
National Party of Australia members of the Parliament of Queensland
Leaders of the Opposition in Queensland
Queensland University of Technology alumni
21st-century Australian politicians